Ice hockey in the People's Republic of China is a minor sport that is gaining popularity quickly in the country. The history of ice hockey in China dates back to the mid-20th century. The Chinese Ice Hockey Association acts as the governing body for the sport in the country. China has men's, women's, and junior national teams that compete against other national teams. The China national ice hockey teams are making major preparations for improvements in order to be competitive for the  2022 Winter Olympics.

The Chinese Ice Hockey Championship is an national ice hockey championship that is played annually by amateur teams throughout China. The Chinese Ice Hockey Championship was first held in 1953.

Professional ice hockey
Founded in 2016, Kunlun Red Star is presently the only professional men's ice hockey team based in China. Based in Beijing, Kunlun Red Star plays in the Kontinental Hockey League (KHL), a professional ice hockey league with teams based in Belarus, Finland, Kazakhstan, Latvia, and Russia.

Kunlun Red Star also owns a professional women's ice hockey team, Shenzhen KRS Vanke Rays, based in Shenzhen. Established in 2017, KRS Vanke Rays played in the Canadian Women's Hockey League, with teams based in Canada and the United States.

From 2004 to 2017, several men's ice hockey teams based in China played in Asia League Ice Hockey, a professional league made up of teams from Japan, South Korea, and the Russian Far East.

In 2015, Andong Song became the first Chinese-national drafted by a National Hockey League (NHL) team, a men's professional league consisting of teams from Canada, and the United States. Song was drafted by the New York Islanders in the 6th round (172nd overall) in the 2015 NHL Entry Draft.

In 2019, Rudi Ying became the first Chinese-native to score a goal in the KHL. An impending domestic league has been proposed by the Chinese Ice Hockey Association. The league is assumed to consist of eight clubs; four being the Kunlun Red Star, Jilin City Investment, Beijing Shougang and Zhongshang Hokay.

References